The Ländereinführungsgesetz , adopted on 22 July 1990 by the Volkskammer recreated the Länder in the German Democratic Republic where they had been abolished in 1952. Since the new länder were formed by merging the kreise of East Germany, their borders differ from the ones of 1947. Originally, it was supposed to come into force on 14 October. Eventually, this date was changed to 3 October, the date of reunification, by the Einigungsvertrag.

The act also was supposed to regulate the relationship of the state and the federal level. As, however, it did not come into force before reunification, these parts of the act were immediately superseded by the corresponding articles of the Basic Law and never had any significance.

The full official title of the act is "Verfassungsgesetz zur Bildung von Ländern in der Deutschen Demokratischen Republik"

Composition of the newly created states

See also 
 Administrative divisions of the German Democratic Republic
 New states of Germany
 Constitution of East Germany

References

External links 
 Full text 
 Parts that remain valid until today 

German constitutional law